The Haines House is a historic house in Alliance, Ohio that was an Underground Railroad station.

Description and history
The house is located at 186 W. Market Street. The architect was John Grant and the building was constructed in 1834. The architectural style is Federal. It was placed on the National Register of Historic Places on July 30, 1974.

See also
 Slavery in the United States

References

External links
 * 

Houses on the National Register of Historic Places in Ohio
Houses in Stark County, Ohio
National Register of Historic Places in Stark County, Ohio
Houses on the Underground Railroad
Federal architecture in Ohio
Houses completed in 1834
1834 establishments in Ohio